Ghetto house or  booty house is a subgenre of house music which started being recognized as a distinct style from around 1992 onwards. It features minimal 808 and 909 drum machine-driven tracks and sometimes sexually explicit lyrics.

The template of classic Chicago house music (primarily, "It's Time for the Percolator" by Cajmere) was used with the addition of sexual lyrics. It has usually been made on minimal equipment with little or no effects.  It usually features either a "4-to-the-floor" kick drum or beat-skipping kick drums such as those found in the subgenre "juke" (full sounding, but not too long or distorted) along with Roland 808 and 909 synthesized tom-tom sounds, minimal use of analogue synths, and short, slightly dirty sounding (both sonically and lyrically) vocals samples, often repeated in various ways. Also common are 808 and 909 clap sounds, and full "rapped" verses and choruses.

Ghetto house music artists include: DJ Deeon, Jammin' Gerald, DJ Funk, DJ Milton, DJ Slugo, Waxmaster, Traxman, Parris Mitchell.

Subgenres

Chicago juke
The 2000s saw a rise in footwork/juke music, as a faster variant of ghetto house. Chicago juke songs are generally around 150–165 BPM with beat-skipping kick drums, pounding rapidly (and at times very sparsely) in syncopation with crackling snares, claps, and other sounds reminiscent of old drum machines. The production style is often markedly lo-fi, much like baile funk. Chicago Juke evolved to match the energy of footwork, a dance style born in the disparate ghettos, house parties and underground dance competitions of Chicago. RP Boo, a former footwork dancer, is generally credited with making the first songs that fall within the canon.

See also
 DJ Funk
 Dance Mania

References

External links
From Jack to Juke: 25 Years of Ghetto House
Ghetto Tracks Documentary

House music genres